John M. Clayton  is a 1934 marble sculpture depicting the American lawyer and politician of the same name by Bryant Baker, installed in the United States Capitol, in Washington D.C., as part of the National Statuary Hall Collection. It is one of two statues donated by the state of Delaware The statue was accepted in the collection by Robert G. Houston on June 6, 1934.

The statue is one of three that Baker has had placed in the Collection.

See also
 1934 in art

References

External links
 

1934 establishments in Washington, D.C.
1934 sculptures
Marble sculptures in Washington, D.C.
Monuments and memorials in Washington, D.C.
Clayton, John M.
Sculptures of men in Washington, D.C.